The Azerbaijani mafia is a general term for organized criminal gangs, that consist of ethnic Azerbaijanis. In Russia they are mostly based in Moscow and other major Russia cities like Saint Petersburg. Outside of Russia they are active in most former Soviet states, Turkey, Netherlands, Germany and other Europe countries

History
The Azerbaijani mafia is one of the oldest crime groups in Russia. Outside of a large ethnic Azerbaijani community in Dagestan, Russian cities have always been known destinations for Azerbaijani immigrants. Following the formation of important and powerful organized crime groups among Russians, Chechens, Armenians and Georgians in Moscow, Azerbaijani criminal gangs quickly developed in the early 1980s.
In the 1990s the Azerbaijani groups quickly began their rise to power following the conflicts between the Russian and the Chechen groups. Large-scale immigration of Azerbaijanis to Moscow followed. As well as refugees, ex-guerilla fighters and warlords illegally immigrated to the major Russian cities. Since the position of the Chechen mafia groups was at the time greatly weakened, the newly formed Azerbaijani criminal groups were able to take over a large chunk of the heroin trade. At the time a lot of the trafficking funded military and guerilla operations in the region of Nagorno-Karabakh.
After the war ended, younger generation of impoverished Azerbaijanis living in Moscow and other Russian cities learned their trade, which quickly led to the further formation of Azerbaijani criminal outfits in the former Soviet Union.

Activities

While the most important activity of Azerbaijani gangs was drug trafficking (mostly heroin), they've quickly expanded their operations to other areas of organized crime such as arms trafficking, fraud, money laundering, car theft, extortion, illegal gambling, counterfeiting, prostitution and contract killing. Azerbaijani crime groups have been known to invest in real estate by means of money laundering.

Presence in Europe

In 2018, a scandal occurred in the South of France: the incident took place in Colomiers, near Toulouse. A car with Rahim Namazov, an Azerbaijani national, and his wife was shot at. She died in the attack. This event revealed the very threat of the Azerbijani criminal groups in the heart of Europe. Indeed, shortly after the attack, the Embassy of Azerbaijan in France informed that the target of the attack were known from Azerbaijani security forces and "likely to be related to the mafia".

See also
 Rovshan Janiev
 Operation Black Belt

References

Mafia
Organized crime by ethnic or national origin
Transnational organized crime
Organized crime groups in Azerbaijan
Organized crime groups in Russia
Organised crime groups in Ukraine